Cleavesville is an unincorporated community in Gasconade County, in the U.S. state of Missouri.

History
A post office called Cleavesville was established in 1854, and remained in operation until 1908. The community derives its name from Cleaveland Luster, an early merchant.

References

Unincorporated communities in Gasconade County, Missouri
Unincorporated communities in Missouri